The 1999–2000 Australia Tri-Nation Series (more commonly known as the 1999–2000 Carlton and United Series) was a One Day International (ODI) cricket tri-series where Australia played host to India and Pakistan. Australia and Pakistan reached the Finals, which Australia won 2–0.

Ricky Ponting was the leading scorer of the series  and Glenn McGrath, the leading wicket-taker.

Squads

Group stage

Match results

1st match

2nd match

3rd match

4th match

5th match

6th match

7th match

8th match

9th match

10th match

11th match

12th match

Points table
Australia and Pakistan qualified for the Finals with seven and four wins respectively.

Final series
Australia won the best of three final series against Pakistan 2–0.

1st final

2nd final

References

1999–2000 Australian cricket season
2000 in Australian cricket
2000 in Indian cricket
2000 in Pakistani cricket
1999
International cricket competitions from 1997–98 to 2000